Jarnail Singh Dhillon was a former Indian football player, who played as a centre-back. He was the captain of the India national football team from 1965 to 1967. He was given the Arjuna Award in 1964 for his achievements as a football player. He also competed in the men's tournament at the 1960 Summer Olympics. Considered as one of Asia's best defenders in the 1960s, he spent most of his career in Mohun Bagan.

Club career
Singh began his senior club football career in 1956 at Khalsa Sporting Club of Shri Guru Gobind Singh Khalsa College in Hoshiarpur district of Punjab, with which, he played in DCM Trophy. He then captained Punjab University football team before arriving in Calcutta. In 1958, he went on to play for Rajasthan Club, nicknamed "giant killers" in Kolkata Maidan. Darshan Singh, who played for Rajasthan at that time, helped Singh to complete his transfer.

He was brought in Calcutta giants Mohun Bagan by then head coach Arun Sinha, and signed for the club in 1959. He then represented the team for ten long years until 1968. He also captained the team from 1965 to 1967. His performance against East Bengal in a match of the Kolkata Derby in 1968, was highly praised by one of India's oldest newspaper Amrita Bazar Patrika. With "the mariners", he formed an incredible partnership with Chuni Goswami, brought several laurels for the century-old club by winning the Calcutta Football League six times, IFA Shield and Durand Cup four times. Singh was also part of the Mohun Bagan team that toured to East Africa and played matches in Uganda, Kenya, Zanzibar and Tanganyika.

Singh also represented Bengal at the Santosh Trophy and won it in 1958–59, 1959–60, 1962–63, and 1969–70, before appearing with Punjab in the same competition. He also won the 1970–71 Santosh Trophy with Punjab in Jalandhar, defeating Mysore.

International career
Singh represented India under management of the coach Syed Abdul Rahim, during the "Golden age" of Indian football.

He joined the national team during India's Afghanistan tour in 1959 but not appeared in matches. He played in 1960 Summer Olympics in Rome, and played against some notable players like Flórián Albert of Hungary. He was prominent in the defense as India was narrowly defeated by Hungary by 2–1, and drew 1–1 with mighty France. He then appeared in 1961 Merdeka Cup in Malaysia under coaching of Sailen Manna. Later in the 1962 Asian Games in Jakarta, Singh won the gold medal with India. In the final, Rahim showcased his brilliance, deploying injured Singh as centre forward. According to P. K. Banerjee, Jarnail used to play as a centre-forward in his college days and Rahim's research helped the team surprise the opponent, a 2–0 victory over South Korea.

In 1964 Merdeka Cup, he was part of Indian team that finished runners-up. In the same year, he went on to play for his country at the 1964 AFC Asian Cup, where they also finished as runners-up as Israel won the trophy. From 1965 to 1967, he captained the national team.

Managerial career
Singh took charge of India and managed the team in 1969 Merdeka Cup, and 1970 Singapore Friendship Tournament. He again managed India at Jasson Cup in Afghanistan in 1976.

He became coach of the Punjab football team in Santosh Trophy and managed players like Inder Singh, Sukhwinder Singh and others. Under his coaching, Punjab won title in 1974–75. In the final of that edition, his team thrashed Bengal 6–0. Inder Singh emerged as top scorer of the tournament with 23 goals which is still a record, and Punjab also finished having scored 46 goals.

Personal life
Singh was a victim of the Partition of India. When he was in Lyallpur (now Faisalabad in Pakistan) in 1948, the place was burning due to political madness, and many of his family members were killed. He escaped from that situation and traveled to Amritsar by truck cramped with at least 50 other men, women and children.

Jarnail's son Jagmohan Singh was also a professional footballer who played for India as a defender and participated in 1993 SAARC Gold Cup in Pakistan. After Jagmohan's tragic death in 1996, Singh settled in Canada.

Outside football
Singh was elected as Deputy Director of Sports of the Government of Punjab and worked between 1985 and 1990, and also acted as Director between 1990 and 1994.

Death
He died at the age of 64 due to an asthmatic disorder on 13 October 2000 at Vancouver in Canada.

Honours

Player
Mohun Bagan
Durand Cup: 1959, 1960, 1963, 1964, 1965
IFA Shield: 1960, 1961, 1962, 1967
Rovers Cup: 1966
Calcutta Football League: 1959, 1960, 1962, 1963, 1964, 1965
India
Asian Games Gold medal: 1962
AFC Asian Cup runners-up: 1964
Merdeka Tournament runners-up: 1964; third-place: 1965, 1966

Bengal
 Santosh Trophy: 1958–59, 1959–60, 1962–63, 1969–70

Punjab
 Santosh Trophy: 1970–71

Individual
AFC Asian All Stars: 1965, 1966, 1967
 Arjuna Award: 1964
 Mohun Bagan Ratna: 2012
 The Indian Express India's Most Popular Sportsman: 1960

Records
 Only Indian footballer to be selected as captain of the Asian All Star Football Team in 1966.

Manager
India
Afghanistan Republic Day Cup third place: 1976, 1977

Legacy

In memory of Singh, the I-League "Best Defender Award" is renamed as "Jarnail Singh Award", given to the best defender in each season by the All India Football Federation (AIFF), in collaboration with Football Players' Association of India.

In memory of Singh, a knockout football tournament named Jarnail Singh Memorial Football Tournament has been hosted in Garshankar, Punjab.

See also

 Arjuna award recipients among Indian footballers
 List of India national football team captains
 List of India national football team managers
 History of the India national football team
 List of India international footballers born outside India
 List of association football families

References

Bibliography

External links
 
 

Indian footballers
India international footballers
1936 births
2000 deaths
Footballers from Hoshiarpur
1964 AFC Asian Cup players
Asian Games gold medalists for India
Asian Games medalists in football
Association football defenders
Olympic footballers of India
Footballers at the 1960 Summer Olympics
Footballers at the 1962 Asian Games
Footballers at the 1966 Asian Games
Medalists at the 1962 Asian Games
Recipients of the Arjuna Award
Mohun Bagan AC players
Calcutta Football League players
Indian football managers
India national football team managers
Indian emigrants to Canada